Issy–Val de Seine is a station on RER C served by RER C5 and C7.  Situated in Issy-les-Moulineaux, in the départment of Hauts-de-Seine, the station serves the business district of Val de Seine. In rush hours, the station is served by 12 trains per hour; in off-peak hours, it is served by 6 trains per hour.

The station provides an interchange with Paris Tramway Line 2. It was the terminus of the tramway between 1997 and 2009, when the tramway was extended eastwards to Porte de Versailles.

See also 
 List of stations of the Paris RER

External links 

 

Railway stations in France opened in 1902
Réseau Express Régional stations in Hauts-de-Seine